Jamie Callender (born January 9, 1965) is an attorney, college professor, and current member of the Ohio General Assembly, representing the 57th district which includes the Lake County communities of Concord Township, Kirtland, Kirtland Hills, LeRoy Township, Madison, Madison Township, North Perry, Perry, Perry Township, Waite Hill, Willoughby Hills, as well as most of both Mentor and Painesville Township. He currently is Chairman of Public Utilities and Finance, as well as serving on Civil Justice, Joint Education Oversight Committee, Rules and Reference. Ohio House Committees

After practicing law full-time as a partner at Buckley King LPA, he founded Callender Law Group and The Callender Group, education law and consulting firms based in Concord and Columbus, Ohio, and Nashville, Tennessee. Callender is also an adjunct professor of political science at Kent State University for the Columbus Program in Intergovernmental Issues.
In 1997, Callender was elected to the Ohio House of Representatives, and would be elected three more times. As Chairman of the Ohio House Education Committee, Callender was involved in the creation of Ohio's charter school laws and later legislative reforms related to community ("charter") schools, and the introduction of the concept of "value added" as a measurement of a child's educational progress. Callender was also appointed as Ohio's representative on the Education Commission of the States (ECS), which worked with the Bush administration and various state governors to develop national education standards and accountability measurements, work which led to the No Child Left Behind Act.

In 2004, Callendar was term limited from the state House and unsuccessfully ran for the state Senate, losing in the Republican primary to Tim Grendell. In 2018, he successfully returned to the Ohio House, winning an open seat similar to the seat he previously represented.

In 2021, Callender introduced an overhaul of the state's education funding system, the Ohio Fair School Funding Plan (HB 1).

References

Links 

 Representative Jamie Callendar (official site)

1965 births
Living people
Republican Party members of the Ohio House of Representatives
People from Mayfield, Kentucky
21st-century American politicians
Cleveland State University alumni
Cleveland–Marshall College of Law alumni